Ribaucourt is a Brussels Metro station on the northern segment of lines 2 and 6. It opened on 2 October 1988 and is located on the / in the municipality of Molenbeek-Saint-Jean, in the western part of Brussels, Belgium. It takes its name from the Belgian noble family De Ribaucourt, and De Ribaucourt park and castle.

Brussels metro stations
Railway stations opened in 1988
Molenbeek-Saint-Jean